Sumii (written: 住井 or 角居) is a Japanese surname.

People
Notable people with the surname include:

, Japanese horse trainer
, Japanese social reformer, writer, and novelist

Characters
 , a fictional character from Kamen Rider Gaim; see List of Kamen Rider Gaim characters

See also

 
 Sumi (disambiguation)
 Sumie (disambiguation)

Japanese-language surnames